Clifford Peeples (sometimes spelled Clifford Peoples; born circa 1970) is a self-styled pastor in Northern Ireland who has been associated with Ulster loyalist activity. Peeples has been a member of the Ulster Volunteer Force (UVF), the Loyalist Volunteer Force (LVF) prisoners' spokesman and leader of the Orange Volunteers. He has taken a prominent role in opposing the Northern Ireland Protocol in the courts.

Early years
According to writers Henry McDonald and Jim Cusack, Peeples had been a member of the Ulster Volunteer Force (UVF) early in his life. This is also confirmed by Steve Bruce. At some point, he was given security clearance for RAF Aldergrove. He did not come to any prominence, however, until the mid-1990s when he was a leading activist with Families Against Intimidation and Terror.

Loyalist Volunteer Force
Peeples became close to another pastor, Portadown-based Kenny McClinton, who had formerly been a member of the Ulster Defence Association (UDA) before falling out with that organisation and joining forces with the UVF Mid-Ulster brigadier Billy Wright. According to McDonald and Cusack, Peeples and McClinton were also linked to a British intelligence agent known as "the Pastor." Together the three associates launched a propaganda campaign against the Progressive Unionist Party (PUP) and Ulster Democratic Party (UDP) through which they hoped to destabilise the nascent Northern Ireland peace process. McDonald and Cusack further claimed that Peeples, McClinton and "the Pastor" helped to convince Wright to break from the UVF, with which he had been in dispute over what he had said was their lack of reaction to the Drumcree conflict, to establish the Loyalist Volunteer Force (LVF). The three helped convince Wright, who was an evangelical Christian, that they intended the new group to be an "army of God."

Political activity
Peeples was also involved in Ulster nationalist politics as a member of the Ulster Independence Movement. He was, along with McClinton, one of two unsuccessful candidates for the party in Belfast West in the 1996 elections to the Northern Ireland Forum, jointly securing only 43 votes (out of 42,000). In keeping with UIM policy, Peeples campaigned against the Good Friday Agreement and on 24 April 1998, he shared a platform at an Antrim rally with Democratic Unionist Party (DUP) councillors Jack McKee and Sammy Wilson at which he set fire to a copy of the document whilst members of the crowd shouted "and burn Fenians too".

As a political figure he retained his links to the LVF, and during an LVF hunger strike in the Maze Prison he went into the jail to discuss the incident with the loyalist prisoners. His links to this dissident group did not go unnoticed amongst the more mainstream elements of loyalist paramilitarism however. For a time he ran a flower shop on the Crumlin Road but this was ransacked in 1997 in an attack that Peeples blamed on loyalist racketeers. Peeples was seen as a target by the UVF because of his association with the LVF and their leader, the former Mid-Ulster UVF brigadier Billy Wright. He then resettled on the Woodvale Road, Greater Shankill where he began styling himself as a pastor.

Orange Volunteers
A group known as the Orange Volunteers (OV) had existed in the early 1970s before disappearing. However, the name was revived in late 1998 by a group of Protestant fundamentalists based in Stoneyford, County Antrim who launched a series of pipe bomb attacks on Gaelic Athletic Association halls and the homes of prominent Irish nationalists in County Antrim and County Londonderry. The group also carried out 11 simultaneous arson attacks on Catholic churches. 

In 1999 the Royal Ulster Constabulary, using a bugging device, overheard a conversation between a local DUP politician and Peeples, who was the leader of the group, in which the politician encouraged Peeples to attack local Irish republicans. Peeples was the leader from the group's foundation in 1998 until 1999. He defended the activities of the OV by arguing that they were "defenders of the reformed faith" and that the Roman Catholic Church was a tool of the Antichrist.

Peeples was assistant pastor at the Bethel Pentecostal Church on Belfast's Shankill Road when in 1999 he was arrested for paramilitary offences and given a 10-year jail sentence after a pipe bomb and grenades were found in his car. Peeples' car had been stopped outside Dungannon on the M1 motorway when the discovery was made, with his passenger, well-known loyalist, James McGookin-Fisher also arrested. Six months before Peeples had also been arrested after grenades were discovered in the church hall but no charges were made.

Having been replaced as leader of the OV, Peeples was disowned by the movement whilst on remand and in December 2000 he, along with Stuart Wilson from Glenavy and Alan Lynn from Antrim, was handed a death sentence by the new leadership supposedly for leading a "black propaganda campaign" against the group from prison. Although the precise nature of Peeples' transgressions were not discussed an OV statement claimed that:

The Orange Volunteers believe Peeples is deliberately seeding dissent within loyalism. He has received three or four warnings to stop orchestrating a campaign of misinformation against the Orange Volunteer leadership from within Maghaberry prison. He chose to ignore those warnings. So too did Wilson and Stuart [sic]. That is the reason behind the death sentences.

Subsequent activity
Whilst in Maghaberry prison, Peeples was involved in two separate attacks on republican prisoners, according to the Pat Finucane Centre. He also led a prisoners' campaign in support of segregation as republicans and loyalists were mixed freely in the jail.

Released from jail in 2004 he returned to Bethel Church and was installed a minister at Easter 2005 in a move that divided the church. Peeples distributed the anti-Catholic Rome Watch pamphlet and soon split the church as Pastor John Hull, who had joined in 2001 whilst Peeples was in prison, accused Peeples of bigotry, leading to the church breaking into two factions and legal action following. Rome Watch was produced by Pastor Alan Campbell, a friend and mentor of Peeples who shares his belief in British Israelism.

He is married to Suzanne Peeples, who ran as an Independent Unionist in the Upper Bann constituency in the 2007 Assembly election, coming last with less than 0.2%.

Peeples was the official applicant in a court case launched from 2020–22 by Ulster loyalists against the British Government in respect of the  Northern Ireland Protocol.

References

1970 births
Living people
Ulster Volunteer Force members
Loyalist Volunteer Force
Ulster Independence Movement politicians
Clergy from Belfast